Khas Music originates from the practices of the Nepali Khas society.

Castes like Damai, Gandharva, Gaine play musical instruments and sing during festive occasions of the Khas people. Due to modernization this practice has almost disappeared and mass electronic media like television, internet is quickly taking over as means of entertainment especially in the Kathmandu valley.

The term Khas Music as a genre is on the decline too as the term Khas itself is obsolete. The Khas people have adopted surnames of Chettris and Bahuns.

See also 
Music of Nepal

References

Nepalese musical genres
Khas people
Culture of Karnali
Culture of Sudurpashchim